The 2015–16 Florida Atlantic Owls women's basketball team represented Florida Atlantic University during the 2015–16 NCAA Division I women's basketball season. The Owls, led by fourth year head coach Kellie Lewis-Jay, play their home games at FAU Arena and are members of Conference USA. They finished the season 14–16, 6–12 in C-USA play to finish in a tie for eleventh place. They lost in the first round of the C-USA women's tournament to North Texas.

Roster

Schedule

|-
!colspan=9 style="background:#003366; color:#CE2029;"| Exhibition

|-
!colspan=9 style="background:#003366; color:#CE2029;"| Non-conference regular season

|-
!colspan=9 style="background:#003366; color:#CE2029;"| Conference USA regular season

|-
!colspan=9 style="background:#003366; color:#CE2029;"| Conference USA Women's Tournament

See also
2015–16 Florida Atlantic Owls men's basketball team

References

Florida Atlantic Owls women's basketball seasons
Florida Atlantic